The 1974–75 Rugby League Premiership was the inaugural edition of the end of season Rugby League Premiership competition.

The winners were Leeds.

First round

Second round

Replay

Semi finals

Final

Notes

References
 
 

1975 in English rugby league